Hot Cakes  is the third studio album by British rock band the Darkness, released on 20 August 2012 on Canary Dwarf Records. Produced by Nick Brine and band members Justin and Dan Hawkins, the album is the band's first since their 2011 reunion, and the first to feature founding bassist Frankie Poullain since the release of Permission to Land in 2003. It is also the last album to feature all 4 original members, after Ed Graham's departure in 2014.  Despite not being released until 20 August, the album was made available to stream on the Rolling Stone website on 14 August.

Background
In 2011, the Darkness reunited following a five-year break-up, with Poullain returning to the band, replacing his successor, Richie Edwards. Regarding the band's reunion, drummer Ed Graham stated:

I heard a rumour that Dan and Justin [Hawkins] were actually writing songs together again and, having not spoken to them for ages, I emailed them. Basically I presumed that they were going to reform but I didn't really know that I was going to be in it. Then Dan, one day, was in London and he said, "Ed, I'd like to meet with you" and we just had a drink and he said, "we've been writing songs together for months and we've just finally got to a stage of where we really want the original four people, so are you interested?" Which was obviously great.

Composition
The majority of the album was recorded at guitarist Dan Hawkins's home, Leeders Farm, in Norfolk. Discussing the album in comparison to the band's previous two studio albums, Permission to Land and One Way Ticket to Hell... and Back, drummer Ed Graham noted: "I think that we all feel that the second Darkness album is a bit over produced and maybe lost its way in places, a bit. I think we wanted to return to the form we were in; we wanted to make something that was more like Permission to Land than the second album. There are a couple of songs on this new album that are actually really old songs that we played ten years ago when we first formed."

The track "She Just a Girl, Eddie" was written about Graham's ex-girlfriend. Prior the album's release, Graham noted: "Justin's written a song about my ex-girlfriend which is slightly embarrassing. He wrote a song called 'She Just a Girl Eddie' and it's very obviously about the split up with my ex. It doesn't mention her name but I enjoy playing that. It's a good song. I'm not speaking to her so I don't know if she's heard it or not. I'm not sure how she'd feel about it." Justin Hawkins said of the album, "Hot Cakes has a nice raw feel to it like the first album had, with occasional luxurious moments akin to the second. We're proud of the songs and we can't wait for people to hear them. We've been playing a lot of the material from the album in the live set for some time now. Each time we play a new song it feels like a deep powerful thrust in a frenzied love ritual between us and our fans." The album includes a cover of Radiohead's single "Street Spirit (Fade Out)", of which Hawkins said: "We included the Radiohead cover because it has been a live favourite for many moons, and we wanted to release a definitive recording of our interpretation."

Reception

Hot Cakes received generally positive reviews from critics. According to the website Metacritic, which assigns a weighted mean rating out of 100 to reviews from mainstream critics, the album received an average review score of 67/100, based on 24 reviews, which indicates "generally favorable reviews". 
 
Allmusic's Matt Collar wrote a positive review, noting: "Perhaps nobody expected the band to ever match the giddy, karate-kick high of Permission to Land, but the group's comeback album, Hot Cakes, is definitely worthy of throwing more than a few devil horns the band's way." NME magazine stated: "Nothing has changed, except the world's perception of them. Now they are sober, and not in everyone's face all the time, so we can all take them in the good-natured, fun spirit in which they were always intended." The Guardian praised the band's comeback, stating: "If the first chapter of The Darkness' career was book-ended by glittering rise and ignominious disintegration, their return has been a more understated and purposeful affair. [...] Hot Cakes bulges with infectious melodies, blazing leads and strident riffing, Justin Hawkins' unmistakable falsetto adding pathos and silliness in equal measure." Rolling Stones Chuck Eddy noted: "Hot Cakes stays amusing, mixing beer-barrel chuggers with proud schlock ballads." The A.V. Clubs Jason Heller gave the album a negative review, stating: "Hot Cakes marks the point where The Darkness has stopped cannibalizing the golden age of stadium rock and simply started cannibalizing itself. And, despite Hawkins' inveterate crotch-grabbing, there was never that much meat there to begin with."

Track listing

Personnel
The following people contributed to Hot Cakes:

The Darkness
 Justin Hawkins – vocals, guitar
 Dan Hawkins – guitar
 Frankie Poullain – bass guitar
 Ed Graham – drums

Additional musicians
 Ian Anderson – flute ("Cannonball")

Recording personnel
Nick Brine – producer, engineer
Justin Hawkins – producer
Dan Hawkins – producer
Bob Ezrin – mixing, producer (1)
Justin Courtelyou – mixing engineer
Joshua Tyrell – recording assistant
Owen Morgan – recording assistant
Greg Calbi – mastering

Artwork
Diego Gravinese – sleeve art, original photograph, digital work, oil painting on canvas
Thom Lessner – art direction, concept
Rob Chenery at Tourist, London – design, art direction

Chart performance

References

The Darkness (band) albums
2012 albums
Wind-up Records albums